Several countries and regions have flag-bearing counties:

Flags of counties of England
Flags of counties of Liberia
Flags of counties of Scotland
Flags of counties of Wales